Agripina Kundu (born ) is a Kenyan volleyball player, playing as a libero. She is part of the Kenya women's national volleyball team.

She participated at the 2014 FIVB Volleyball World Grand Prix.
On club level she played for Kenya Pipeline Company in 2014 after a company director offered her a permanent job at the end of a match. In the same year she began to represent her country at volleyball.

She was chosen to represent Kenya at the 2020 Summer Olympics.  The team lost their first match against Japan in straight sets.

References

External links
 Profile at FIVB.org

1993 births
Living people
Kenyan women's volleyball players
Place of birth missing (living people)
Volleyball players at the 2020 Summer Olympics
Olympic volleyball players of Kenya